The League of Jewish Women (LJW) is a voluntary Jewish women's service organisation in the United Kingdom.  Affiliated to more than 30 other national and international organisations, membership is open to Jewish men and women.  LJW is the UK affiliate of the International Council of Jewish Women.

LJW is a voluntary service organisation that provides help wherever it is needed, within both the Jewish and the wider community.

LJW members are organised in local groups who meet for social events and arrange their voluntary service.

Voluntary work ranges from hospital and home visits to working in prisons, and helping in day centres for older people.  Members also work in schools, baby clinics and contact centres.

The President of the League of Jewish Women is Yvonne Josse.

External links 
League of Jewish Women official site
TheJC.com - new President LJW June 2010
JVN - The LJW

Jewish charities based in the United Kingdom
Jewish community organizations
Jewish British history